The 1920 season was the first year of competitive football in the Baltic country as an independent nation.

Matches
The team only played one game in their first year. It was the first time Estonian players played on grass field, as the local teams only played on gravel covered pitches at the time. For Finland, it was the 12th official match.

Finland vs Estonia

Players

Debutants
These 13 players were capped in the first match:
 #1–#11: Ernst Joll, Elmar Klaos, Arnold Kuulman, Heinrich Paal, Rudolf Paal, Arnold Pihlak, Artur Prunn, Karl Ree, Gustav Sepp, Otto Silber, Oskar Üpraus
 #12–#13: Raimond Põder, Vladimir Tell

References

1920
1920 national football team results
National